

Love Lost is a studio album, released on June 11, 1959, by jazz vocal and instrumental group The Four Freshmen. Released at the height of their fame, the album is now considered a "vintage" recording. In the same year, The Four Freshmen  won both the Metronome and Playboy polls as top jazz vocal group.

The album was reissued in 1998 on a double CD with Voices in Love.

Track listing
 “Love Lost” (Bob Flanigan, Don Barbour, Ross Barbour, Ken Albers)
 “Spring Is Here” (Richard Rodgers, Lorenz Hart)
 “I'm a Fool to Want You” (Joel Herron, Frank Sinatra, Jack Wolf)
 “I Should Care” (Axel Stordahl, Paul Weston, Sammy Cahn)
 “I Could Have Told You” (Jimmy Van Heusen, Carl Sigman)
 “If I Ever Love Again” (Russ Carlyle, Richard Reynolds)
 “The Gal That Got Away” (Harold Arlen, Ira Gershwin)
 “When Your Lover Has Gone” (Einar Aaron Swan)
 “I Wish I Didn't Love You So” (Frank Loesser)
 “I Wish I Knew” (Harry Warren, Mack Gordon)
 “I'll Never Smile Again” (Ruth Lowe)
 “Little Girl Blue” (Richard Rodgers, Lorenz Hart)

Personnel
 Don Barbour – vocals
 Ross Barbour – vocals
 Bob Flanigan – vocals
 Ken Albers – vocals

Vocal arrangements Dick Reynolds and Ken Albers
Music arranged by Dick Reynolds

Notes

References

 Carr, Ian; Fairweather, Digby; and Priestley, Brian. The Rough Guide to Jazz: 3rd Edition. London: Rough Guides, 2004.
 Feather, Leonard. The Encyclopedia of Jazz. New York: Horizon Press, 1960.

External links 
 allmusic Biography of The Four Freshmen
 The Four Freshman Society Inc. website

1959 albums
The Four Freshmen albums
Capitol Records albums